The Consuegra Dam is a ruined Roman buttress dam in Toledo province, Castilla–La Mancha, Spain. The dam dates to the 3rd or 4th century AD.
It is on the River Amarguillo upstream from Consuegra.

Although less than 5 metres high, the dam was remarkably long, over 600 metres. The reservoir seems to have had a dual function of supplying water to Consuegra and irrigating farmland.
The settlement dates back to pre-Roman times and was important enough in Roman times to have a circus.

The river Amarguillo has an irregular flow and in 1891 a flood badly damaged the town of Consuegra. The dam may also have suffered damage at this time.

Conservation
The structure is protected by the heritage listing Bien de Interés Cultural.

See also 
 List of Roman dams and reservoirs
 Roman architecture
 Roman engineering

Notes

References

Further reading 
 
 
 
 
 
 

Ancient Roman buildings and structures in the province of Toledo
Bien de Interés Cultural landmarks in the Province of Toledo 
Buttress dams in Spain
Roman dams in Spain
Water supply and sanitation in Castilla-La Mancha